Juan Facundo Quiroga (November 27, 1788 – February 16, 1835) was an Argentine caudillo (military strongman) who supported federalism at the time when the country was still in formation.

Early years
Quiroga was born in San Antonio, La Rioja, the son of a traditional but impoverished Riojan family of cattle breeders. He was sent at a young age to San Juan to be educated. Early in his life, he became a problem child, and escaped from school. During his wandering in the desert between San Juan and La Rioja, he purportedly encountered and killed a cougar, earning him the nickname El Tigre de los Llanos ("the Tiger of the Plains", after the Llanos, the region of his birth).

After the May Revolution proclaimed the self-rule of the country, Quiroga tried to enter the independentist army. He travelled to San Luis to enter the Granaderos a Caballo Regiment, led by General José de San Martín. He was imprisoned and eventually expelled due to his bad temper.

He moved back to La Rioja and became a businessman until 1820. That year the central government of Buenos Aires fell, and the province became autonomous.

Governor of La Rioja and federalist leader
Quiroga entered the provincial army and quickly rose to its command, gaining control of the government through his charisma. During the time of the Constitutional Congress of 1824, Quiroga led its forces through the Andean provinces to oppose the centralist tendencies of President Bernardino Rivadavia and the officers of the National Army, which were carrying away a compulsory levy for the upcoming Cisplatine War (1825–1827). Thus, under the flag of Religión o Muerte (Religion or Death), he overthrew the centralist government of San Juan shortly after the central government signed a treaty with Britain by which religious freedom was established.

After the Cisplatine war, the officers of the returning army (of centralist tendencies, known as unitarios) deposed the federalist governments in an attempt to restore the centralised rule of Buenos Aires. General José María Paz took over its province of Córdoba and his officers campaigned through the interior provinces. Quiroga tried to oppose them, but without success, and after defeat in the Battle of La Tablada, he went into self-imposed exile in Buenos Aires. From there, where the coup was quickly defeated, Quiroga led an army towards Córdoba but was defeated in the Battle of Oncativo by Paz's more disciplined forces. Quiroga decided not to give up and tried a more ambitious attempt, marching through territories still occupied by native aboriginals, in order to bypass Córdoba, and attack directly Mendoza, where it succeeded. He took his campaign north along the Andean provinces, until he finally defeated General Gregorio Aráoz de Lamadrid, who led the last remaining unitary forces, in Salta.

After the war, Quiroga established himself as one of the leaders of federalism in Argentina (along with Juan Manuel de Rosas and the caudillo of Santa Fe, Estanislao López), although he declared in his correspondence with Rosas that his ideas were in fact unitarian, but that he became a champion of federalism because people wanted federalism.

Quiroga's death and its consequences

In 1834, Quiroga was appointed by the governor of Buenos Aires (and Representative of Foreign Relations of the Argentine Confederation) Manuel Vicente Maza to mediate between the governors of Tucumán and Salta, but Salta governor De la Torre died before Quiroga could arrive. He was advised that there were plans to murder him on his way back, but Quiroga, disregarding the advice, returned to Buenos Aires through the same way. At Barranca Yaco, a watering place between Córdoba and Santiago del Estero, a party of gunmen ambushed the carriage in which he travelled. Quiroga, confident in his charisma and that his mere presence and resolution would discourage the attackers, appeared through the carriage door and shouted at the gunmen, asking for their commander to confront him. The leader of the party, Santos Pérez, however, did not take chances and killed Quiroga by shooting him through the left eye.

The political crime created a huge crisis in all the Confederation, forcing Maza to resign, and led to the establishment of Rosas' government. Rosas, as the Confederation leader, led the criminal investigation that ended with the prosecution of the governor of Córdoba, José Vicente Reinafé, and his brother as the intellectual perpetrators of the crime. They were hanged along with Santos Pérez in 1837 in Buenos Aires.

In 1845, Domingo F. Sarmiento wrote Facundo, Civilization and Barbarism, a book that reviews the influence of caudillo leaders, which he defines as "barbarism", in the Argentine political and social life, but also as a protest to Rosas' regime, and a call for European education and life style.

Quiroga is buried in La Recoleta Cemetery in Buenos Aires.

In literature 
Jorge Luis Borges wrote an imaginary dialogue between Quiroga and Rosas in Dead Men's Dialogue, in Dreamtigers.

References

External links

 Biography (English)
 Quiroga's Bio (Spanish)

1788 births
1835 deaths
People from La Rioja Province, Argentina
Argentine people of Galician descent
Federales (Argentina)
Governors of La Rioja Province, Argentina
Assassinated Argentine politicians
Argentine military personnel killed in the Argentine Civil War
Deaths by firearm in Argentina
People murdered in Argentina
Burials at La Recoleta Cemetery
Argentine generals